The George Burns Show is a comedy television program that aired on NBC for one season (1958–59). The program was sponsored by Colgate-Palmolive.

The George Burns Show immediately followed the eight-season run of The George Burns and Gracie Allen Show, which had aired on CBS, and shared continuity with the earlier series.

Overview
After Gracie Allen retired in 1958, George Burns tried to continue the old series without her, using many of the characters and settings from their show. In this new series, George was working as a producer in a downtown office, and trying to deal with an assortment of entertainers and oddball theatrical acts as well as his previously established friends. Blanche Morton (Bea Benaderet) was George's secretary, and was keeping George from fawning over attractive women, for Gracie's sake (Gracie was mentioned on the show, but never seen). Blanche's husband Harry Morton (Larry Keating) was George's accountant. Also present were Harry von Zell, Ronnie Burns, and Judi Meredith, all playing themselves.  Meredith had appeared regularly as Ronnie's girlfriend Bonnie Sue MacAfee on the Burns and Allen Show in 1957 and 1958; here she played essentially the same role but as herself.
 
For the February 1959 sweeps, the format was changed to a live sketch-comedy/variety show in the style of The Jack Benny Program, in an attempt to improve the ratings. The ratings didn't improve, however, so they reverted to the sitcom format.

The series ended after 25 episodes.

Episodes

* Unknown

References

1950s American sitcoms
1958 American television series debuts
1959 American television series endings
1950s American variety television series
Black-and-white American television shows
NBC original programming
George Burns